Lewis Smith (born August 1, 1956) is an American actor.

Early life
Smith was born in Chattanooga, Tennessee. He graduated from Lookout Valley High School in 1974.

Career
Smith is best known for the role of Charles Main on the first and second part of North and South miniseries, He also played "Curly Bill" Brocious in the Kevin Costner film Wyatt Earp. Smith co-starred as Perfect Tommy in The Adventures of Buckaroo Banzai Across the 8th Dimension and as trigger-happy National Guardsman "Earl Stuckey" in Walter Hill's Southern Comfort (1981).

He appeared in the early sequences of Love Child playing Amy Madigan's hitch-hiking boyfriend. Smith starred as Bobby Fontana in 1985's The Heavenly Kid. In 1987, he played the title role in the failed television pilot The Man Who Fell to Earth which was based on the David Bowie film from the 1970s. Smith landed a starring role in the short-lived Fox comedy television series Karen's Song. He also co-starred with Sharon Stone and Miguel Ferrer in Badlands 2005, an unsold TV pilot-movie directed by Scottish-born George Miller (not to be confused with the other George Miller who directed the Mad Max movies). He appeared as Jinglebells Cody, a slave fight trainer, in Quentin Tarantino's 2012 film Django Unchained.

Lewis Smith founded The Actors Academy in Los Angeles, which prepares students to work in film and television. Courses taught at Lewis Smith's Actor's Academy cover topics such as camera techniques, sound & lighting, props & marks, auditioning for roles, etc.

Filmography

External links
Lewis Smith's Actors Academy

Biographical note

1956 births
Living people
Male actors from Tennessee
American male television actors
Lee Strasberg Theatre and Film Institute alumni